The 2015 Buffalo Bulls football team represented the University at Buffalo as a member of the East Division of the Mid-American Conference (MAC) during the 2015 NCAA Division I FBS football season. Led by first-year head coach Lance Leipold, the Bulls compiled an overall record of 5–7 with a mark of 3–5 in conference play, placing fourth in the MAC's East Division. The team played their home games at University at Buffalo Stadium in Amherst, New York.

Schedule

Game summaries

Albany

In their first game of the season, the Bulls won, 51–14 over the Albany Great Danes.

@ Penn State

In their second game of the season, the Bulls lost, 27–14 to the Penn State Nittany Lions.

@ Florida Atlantic

In their third game of the season, the Bulls won, 33–15 over the Florida Atlantic Owls.

Nevada

In their fourth game of the season, the Bulls lost, 24–21 to the Nevada Wolf Pack.

Bowling Green

In their fifth game of the season, the Bulls lost, 28–22 to the Bowling Green Falcons.

@ Central Michigan

In their sixth game of the season, the Bulls lost, 51–14 to the Central Michigan Chippewas.

Ohio

In their seventh game of the season, the Bulls won, 41–17 over the Ohio Bobcats.

@ Miami (OH)

In their eighth game of the season, the Bulls won, 29–24 over the Miami RedHawks.

@ Kent State

In their ninth game of the season, the Bulls won, 18–17 over the Kent State Golden Flashes.

Northern Illinois

In their tenth game of the season, the Bulls lost, 41–30 to the Northern Illinois Huskies.

@ Akron

In their eleventh game of the season, the Bulls lost, 42–21 to the Akron Zips.

Massachusetts

In their twelfth game of the season, the Bulls lost, 31–26 to the Massachusetts Minutemen.

References

Buffalo
Buffalo Bulls football seasons
Buffalo Bulls football